The Duchy of Lorraine, originally Upper Lorraine, was a duchy now included in the larger present-day region of Lorraine in northeastern France. Its capital was Nancy.

It was founded in 959 following the division of Lotharingia into two separate duchies: Upper and Lower Lorraine, the westernmost parts of the Holy Roman Empire. The Lower duchy was quickly dismantled, while Upper Lorraine came to be known as simply the Duchy of Lorraine. The Duchy of Lorraine was coveted and briefly occupied by the dukes of Burgundy and the kings of France.

In 1737, the duchy was given to Stanisław Leszczyński, the former king of Poland, who had lost his throne as a result of the War of the Polish Succession, with the understanding that it would fall to the French crown on his death. When Stanisław died on 23 February 1766, Lorraine was annexed by France and reorganized as a province.

History

Lotharingia

Lorraine's predecessor, Lotharingia, was an independent Carolingian kingdom under the rule of King Lothair II (855–869). Its territory had originally been a part of Middle Francia, created in 843 by the Treaty of Verdun, when the Carolingian empire was divided between the three sons of Louis the Pious. Middle Francia was allotted to Emperor Lothair I, therefore called Lotharii Regnum. On his death in 855, it was further divided into three parts, of which his son Lothair II took the northern one. His realm then comprised a larger territory stretching from the County of Burgundy in the south to the North Sea. In French, this area became known as Lorraine, while in German, it was eventually known as Lothringen. In the Alemannic language once spoken in Lorraine, the -ingen suffix signified a property; thus, in a figurative sense, "Lotharingen" can be translated as "Land belonging to Lothair", or more simplified *Lothair's realm*.

As Lothair II had died without heirs, his territory was divided by the 870 Treaty of Meerssen between East and West Francia and finally came under East Frankish rule as a whole by the 880 Treaty of Ribemont. After the East Frankish Carolingians became extinct with the death of Louis the Child in 911, Lotharingia once again attached itself to West Francia, but was conquered by the German king Henry the Fowler in 925. Stuck in the conflict with his rival Hugh the Great, in 942 King Louis IV of France renounced all claims to Lotharingia.

Duchy of Upper Lorraine
In 953, the German king Otto I had appointed his brother Bruno the Great Duke of Lotharingia. In 959, Bruno divided the duchy into Upper and Lower Lorraine; this division became permanent following his death in 965. The Upper Duchy was further "up" the river system, that is, it was inland and to the south. Upper Lorraine was first denominated as the Duchy of the Moselle, both in charters and narrative sources, and its duke was the dux Mosellanorum. The usage of Lotharingia Superioris and Lorraine in official documents begins later, around the fifteenth century. The first duke and deputy of Bruno was Frederick I of Bar, son-in-law of Bruno's sister Hedwig of Saxony.

Lower Lorraine disintegrated into several smaller territories and only the title of a "Duke of Lothier" remained, held by Brabant. After the duchy of the Moselle came into the possession of René of Anjou, the name "Duchy of Lorraine" was adopted again, only retrospectively called "Upper Lorraine". At that time, several territories had already split off, such as the County of Luxembourg, the Electorate of Trier, the County of Bar and the "Three Bishoprics" of Verdun, Metz and Toul.

The border between the Empire and the Kingdom of France remained relatively stable throughout the Middle Ages. In 1301, Count Henry III of Bar had to receive the western part of his lands (Barrois mouvant) as a fief by King Philip IV of France. In 1475, the Burgundian duke Charles the Bold campaigned for the Duchy of Lorraine, but was finally defeated and killed at the 1477 Battle of Nancy. In the 1552 Treaty of Chambord, a number of insurgent Protestant Imperial princes around Elector Maurice of Saxony ceded the Three Bishoprics to King Henry II of France in turn for his support.

Due to the weakening of Imperial authority during the 1618–1648 Thirty Years' War, France was able to occupy the duchy in 1634 and retained it until 1661 when Charles IV was restored. In 1670, the French invaded again, forcing Charles into exile; his nephew and heir Charles V (1643–1690) spent his life in the service of the Imperial House of Habsburg. France returned the Duchy in the 1697 Treaty of Ryswick ending the Nine Years' War and Charles' son Leopold (1679–1729), became duke and was known as 'Leopold the Good;' in the 1701–1714 War of the Spanish Succession, parts of Lorraine, including the capital Nancy, were again occupied by France, but Leopold continued to reign at the Château de Lunéville.

In 1737, after the War of the Polish Succession, an agreement between France, the Habsburgs and the Lorraine House of Vaudémont assigned the Duchy to Stanisław Leszczyński, former king of Poland. He was also father-in-law to King Louis XV of France, who lost out to a candidate backed by Russia and Austria in the War of the Polish Succession. The Lorraine duke Francis Stephen, betrothed to the Emperor's daughter Archduchess Maria Theresa, was compensated with the Grand Duchy of Tuscany, where the last Medici ruler had recently died without issue. France also promised to support Maria Theresa as heir to the Habsburg possessions under the Pragmatic Sanction of 1713. Leszczyński received Lorraine with the understanding that it would fall to the French crown on his death. The title of Duke of Lorraine was of course given to Stanisław, but also retained by Francis Stephen, and it figures prominently in the titles of his successors (as a non-claimant family name), the House of Habsburg-Lorraine. When Stanisław died on 23 February 1766, Lorraine was annexed by France and reorganized as a province by the French government.

Culture
Two regional languages survive in the region.

This is distinct from the neighbouring Alsatian language, although the two are often confused. Neither has any form of official recognition.

Lorrain is a Romance dialect spoken by a minority in the southern part of the region.

The duchy produced a number of important painters, including Claude Lorrain, Georges de La Tour and Jean LeClerc.

Like most of France's regional languages (such as Breton, Franco-Provençal, Occitan, Alsatian, Catalan, Basque and Flemish), Lorrain and Lorraine Franconian were largely replaced by French with the advent of mandatory public schooling in the 19th and 20th centuries.

See also
 List of rulers of Lorraine
 Lorraine region
 Lotharingia

References

Further reading
 Herrick, Linda & Wendy Uncapher. Alsace-Lorraine: The Atlantic Bridge to Germany. Janesville, WI: 2003.
 Hughes, S. P. (2005) "Bilingualism in North-East France with specific reference to Rhenish Franconian spoken by Moselle Cross-border (or frontier) workers."
 Putnam, Ruth. Alsace and Lorraine: From Cæsar to Kaiser, 58 B.C.-1871 A.D. New York: 1915.

External links

 Alsace-Lorraine.info
 Lotharingia

 
Duchy of Lorraine
Former provinces of France
Duchies of the Holy Roman Empire
Upper Rhenish Circle
959 establishments
Lotharingia
States and territories established in the 950s
States and territories disestablished in 1766